Lao Yao is a village and tambon (subdistrict) of Ban Hong District, in Lamphun Province, Thailand. In 2005 it had a population of  9641 people. The tambon contains 12 villages.

References

Tambon of Lamphun province
Populated places in Lamphun province